Chinese flaky pastry (also known as Chinese puff pastry) is a form of unleavened flaky pastry used in traditional Chinese pastries that are invariably called subing (soubeng in Cantonese). There are two primary forms, Huaiyang-style (淮揚酥皮) and Cantonese-style pastry (廣式酥皮). Huaiyang-style pastry is used to make delicacies such as Shanghainese 'crab shell' pastries (蟹殼黃) while Cantonese-style pastry is used to make pastries like sweetheart cakes.

Method 
Both forms require creating two doughs: a 'water' dough and an 'oil' dough. The 'water' dough requires mixing of flour, oil or fat, and warm water at a ratio of 10:3:4, while the 'oil' dough requires direct mixing of flour and oil or fat at a ratio of 2:1 or 3:1, which provides for a crumbly mouthfeel and rich flavour.

See also
List of pastries
Flaky pastry
Puff pastry
Types of pastry

References 

Pastries
Doughs
Chinese pastries
Dim sum